Jukka Pekka Sakari Keskisalo (born 27 March 1981) is a Finnish athlete competing in 3000 m steeplechase and 1500 m. He won the 3000 m steeplechase at the 2006 European Championships in Athletics in Gothenburg and was also an Olympian in 2012.

Biography

Background
Born in Varkaus, Pohjois-Savo, Keskisalo took a medal in the junior race at the Nordic Cross Country Championships, winning the bronze in 2000.

Senior athletics career

2000s
Keskisalo finished ninth at the 2003 World Championships in Athletics in Paris with his then personal best time, 8:17.72. The next two seasons were hampered by injuries, but he made a strong comeback in 2006 by taking surprise gold at the 2006 European Championships in Athletics. He ran a tactical race, taking advantage of a slow early pace and staying at the rear of the field until the last 500 metres, when he sprinted and overtook the other competitors one by one.

Less than a week after the European Championships, Keskisalo placed fourth at the Golden League meet in Zürich with his new record time 8:16.74. Later, Keskisalo was voted Finnish Sportspersonality of the year, ahead of Tanja Poutiainen and Tero Pitkämäki.

In 2007 Keskisalo suffered from injuries again. In 2008 he competed for a place in and was selected for the Olympics, however he injured just a few days before his event and was not able to compete. Later in the autumn it was announced that Risto Ulmala would replace Tommy Ekblom as his coach.

In 2009 Keskisalo broke his personal best record time twice before the World Championships in Berlin; first a time of 8:15.59 when finishing third at the Golden League event Meeting Areva in Paris, and later a time of 8:12.93 at the Super Grand Prix event Herculis in Monaco. At the World Championships steeplechase final Keskisalo achieved his best result at the global level when finishing eighth with a time of 8:14.47. On 28 August Keskisalo finally broke Tapio Kantanen's 33 years old Finnish record when finishing sixth in a time of 8:10.67 in Weltklasse Zürich. Keskisalo split from coach Ulmala after the 2009 season. His new coach Ismo Hämäläinen was announced in October 2009. Hämäläinen is more known from cross country skiing and had coached Germany in sprint skiing shortly before.

2010s
In 2012 Keskisalo was able to compete at the Olympics but did not finish the steeplechase final.

References

External links

Tilastopaja profile for Jukka Keskisalo (in Finnish)

1981 births
Living people
People from Varkaus
Finnish male middle-distance runners
Finnish male long-distance runners
Finnish male steeplechase runners
Olympic athletes of Finland
Athletes (track and field) at the 2008 Summer Olympics
Athletes (track and field) at the 2012 Summer Olympics
European Athletics Championships medalists
Sportspeople from North Savo